The following lists events that happened in 1928 in El Salvador.

Incumbents
President: Pío Romero Bosque
Vice President: Gustavo Vides

Events

January
 January – Voters in El Salvador elected the National Democratic Party to all 42 seats in the country's legislature. No results were published.

Undated
 C.D. Tehuacan, a Salvadoran football club, was established.

References

 
El Salvador
1920s in El Salvador
Years of the 20th century in El Salvador
El Salvador